Bratislav "Bata" Đorđević (born October 23, 1938) is a Serbian former professional basketball coach and player. He was a head coach of Crvena zvezda during the 1970s. He is the father of Aleksandar Đorđević, also a professional basketball coach and former player.

Playing career 
Đorđević spent the entire playing career in Radnički from Belgrade which played in the Yugoslav First Basketball League.

Coaching career 
Đorđević began his coaching career in Radnički. But the most important success he has achieved with Crvena zvezda. He was coach of the Zvezda team that won the 1971–72 Yugoslav League title. The team included Zoran Slavnić, Dragan Kapičić, Vladimir Cvetković, and Ljubodrag Simonović among others.

During his stint with Zvezda, his son Aleksandar had started to play basketball. Aleksandar did not get a serious chance in Crvena zvezda and continued his career with rival Partizan and later become one of the best Yugoslav and Serbian basketball players.

Besides Crvena zvezda, Đorđević coached many clubs and two national teams. The most important clubs that he trained are: Radnički, Branik Maribor, IMT Belgrade, Limoges CSP.

Also, he coached the national teams of Iraq and the United Arab Emirates. At the 1982 Asian Games his team, Irag, had a 251–33 win over Yemen.

Đorđević founded the first basketball camps in Yugoslavia, in Zlatibor (1975) and Bor (1976).

Personal life 
In addition to his coaching career, Đorđević worked as a physical education teacher at the Marko Orešković Elementary School in New Belgrade from 1967–1971.

His brother Predrag "Buca" Đorđević is a former basketball coach.

Coaching record

Yugoslav First Basketball League 

|- 
| align="left"|Crvena zvezda
| align="left"|1971–72
| 22 || 17 || 5 ||  || style="background:gold;"| Champions
|- 
| align="left"|Crvena zvezda
| align="left"|1972–73
| 26 || 20 || 6 ||  || style="background:silver;"| Runner-up
|- 
| align="left"|Crvena zvezda
| align="left"|1976–77
| 26 || 15 || 11 ||  || 6th
|- 
| align="left"|Crvena zvezda
| align="left"|1977–78
| 26 || 12 || 14 ||  || 8th
|- 
| align="left"|Crvena zvezda
| align="left"|1978–79
| 22 || 9 || 13 ||  || 7th
|-class="sortbottom"
| align="center" colspan=2|Career||||||||||

See also 
 List of Red Star Belgrade basketball coaches

References

1938 births
Living people
Basketball players from Belgrade
Apollon Patras B.C. coaches
KK Crvena zvezda head coaches
KK Crvena Zvezda executives
KK IMT Beograd coaches
KK Profikolor coaches
KK Lifam coaches
BKK Radnički coaches
Yugoslav men's basketball players
Yugoslav basketball coaches
Serbian men's basketball coaches
Limoges CSP coaches
Yugoslav expatriates in France
Serbian expatriate basketball people in the United Arab Emirates
Serbian expatriate basketball people in Iraq
Serbian expatriate basketball people in France
Serbian expatriate basketball people in Slovenia
Serbian expatriate basketball people in Kuwait